Petar Kurćubić (born 25 May 1961) is a Serbian football manager and former player.

Playing career
Kurćubić played for Zemun in the 1989–90 Yugoslav Second League, helping the club win promotion to the Yugoslav First League.

Managerial career
Kurćubić started his managerial career with Novi Sad. He was appointed as manager of Obilić in late December 1999. However, Kurćubić was replaced by Dragan Lacmanović in late January 2000 during preparations for the second part of the season.

Later on, Kurćubić served as manager of numerous clubs in his homeland and abroad, including Macedonian Pobeda (2004–August 2005), Azerbaijani Olimpik Baku (October 2005–2006), Mladost Apatin (June 2006–June 2007), Banat Zrenjanin (June–October 2007), ČSK Čelarevo (two spells), Slovak Nitra (December 2008–June 2009), Slovak Dolný Kubín (2010–2011), Hajduk Kula (September–December 2011), Spartak Subotica (two spells; September 2012–October 2013 and June 2014–April 2015), Novi Pazar (June–August 2015), Bosnian Borac Banja Luka (September–October 2015), TSC Bačka Topola (June–December 2017), and Bosnian Krupa (October 2018–March 2019).

References

External links
 
 

1961 births
Living people
Footballers from Novi Sad
Yugoslav footballers
Serbia and Montenegro footballers
Serbian footballers
Association football midfielders
RFK Novi Sad 1921 players
FK Zemun players
Yugoslav Second League players
Serbia and Montenegro football managers
Serbian football managers
RFK Novi Sad 1921 managers
FK Obilić managers
FK Pobeda managers
FK Mladost Apatin managers
FK Banat Zrenjanin managers
FC Nitra managers
FK Hajduk Kula managers
FK Spartak Subotica managers
FK Novi Pazar managers
FK Borac Banja Luka managers
FK TSC Bačka Topola managers
FK Krupa managers
FK Bačka 1901 managers
Serbian SuperLiga managers
Premier League of Bosnia and Herzegovina managers
Serbia and Montenegro expatriate football managers
Serbian expatriate football managers
Expatriate football managers in North Macedonia
Expatriate football managers in Azerbaijan
Expatriate football managers in Slovakia
Expatriate football managers in Bosnia and Herzegovina
Serbia and Montenegro expatriate sportspeople in North Macedonia
Serbia and Montenegro expatriate sportspeople in Azerbaijan
Serbian expatriate sportspeople in Slovakia
Serbian expatriate sportspeople in Bosnia and Herzegovina